North Takoma station was a train station on the B&O Metropolitan Subdivision near the border of Takoma Park and Silver Spring in Montgomery County, Maryland.

History
North Takoma station once served passengers near the present-day site of Montgomery College, adjacent to a hotel operated by Benjamin Franklin Gilbert, the founder and first mayor of Takoma Park. Gilbert operated the hotel into the early 1900s before financial difficulties forced him to sell the property. In 1908, the Bliss Electrical College moved to the site of the hotel from its former campus in downtown Washington. Montgomery College absorbed Bliss in the 1950s, and continues to have a campus on this site today. 

The station ceased to receive passenger service sometime in the first half of the 20th century, and was abandoned by the time construction of the Washington Metro began. This infrastructural modernization project, which impacted the Metropolitan Subdivision between Union Station and Silver Spring, eliminated all visible traces of the station in the 1960s. Today, the former site of the station houses an important pedestrian bridge across the Metropolitan Branch, providing a link for the campus of Montgomery College, which now spans the tracks.

Future
The vicinity once occupied by this Baltimore & Ohio station is currently being considered for an infill station on the Red Line of the Washington Metro. As of 2021, the project is in the initial stages of planning public inquiry.

References 

Former Baltimore and Ohio Railroad stations
Railway stations in Montgomery County, Maryland